A glittering generality or glowing generality is an emotionally appealing phrase so closely associated with highly valued concepts and beliefs that it carries conviction without supporting information or reason. Such highly valued concepts attract general approval and acclaim. Their appeal is to emotions such as love of country and home, and desire for peace, freedom, glory, and honor. They ask for approval without examination of the reason.  They are typically used in propaganda posters/advertisements and used by propagandists and politicians.

Origins
The term dates from the mid-19th century in the American context.   Advocates for abolition of slavery argued that the institution was contradictory to the United States Declaration of Independence's statements that "all men are created equal" and possessed natural rights to "life, liberty, and the pursuit of happiness." Proslavery opponents countered that the Declaration was a collection of inspirational statements intended for revolution, rather than a concrete set of principles for civil society. Rufus Choate, a Whig senator from Massachusetts, likely brought the term into general discourse in his August 1856 public letter to the Maine Whig Committee. In the letter, Choate expressed fear that antislavery Whigs, inspired by the Declaration's "glittering and sound generalities," would destroy the Union. The letter – and especially Choate's phrase – became the topic of much public debate in the northern press. However, it is unclear whether the phrase was originated by Choate or Franklin J. Dickman, a judge and legal scholar of that era. Abraham Lincoln, in an April 6, 1859 letter to Henry L. Pierce, criticized political opponents of the day who slighted the foundational principles of Thomas Jefferson as "glittering generalities".  Lincoln asserted that Jefferson's abstract ideals were not mere rhetoric, but the "definitions and axioms of free society."

The term then came to be used for any set of ideas or principles that are appealing but nonspecific.  In the 1930s, the Institute for Propaganda Analysis popularized the term as one of its "seven propaganda devices".

Qualities
A glittering generality has two qualities: it is vague and it has positive connotations. Words and phrases such as "common good", "reform", "courage", "democracy", "freedom", "hope", "patriotism", "strength", are terms with which people all over the world have powerful associations, and they may have trouble disagreeing with them. However, these words are highly abstract and ambiguous, and meaningful differences exist regarding what they actually mean or should mean in the real world. George Orwell described such words at length in his essay "Politics and the English Language"
 The words democracy, socialism, freedom, patriotic, realistic, justice have each of them several different meanings which cannot be reconciled with one another. In the case of a word like democracy, not only is there no agreed definition, but the attempt to make one is resisted from all sides. It is almost universally felt that when we call a country democratic we are praising it: consequently the defenders of every kind of regime claim that it is a democracy, and fear that they might have to stop using that word if it were tied down to any one meaning. Words of this kind are often used in a consciously dishonest way. That is, the person who uses them has his own private definition, but allows his hearer to think he means something quite different. Statements like "Marshal Pétain was a true patriot," "The Soviet press is the freest in the world," "The Catholic Church is opposed to persecution," are almost always made with intent to deceive. Other words used in variable meanings, in most cases more or less dishonestly, are:  class, totalitarian, liberal, reactionary,  equality.

See also 

 Abstract concept
Buzzword
 Code word
 Dog-whistle
 Forer effect
 Hardworking families
 Ideograph (rhetoric)
 Logical fallacy
 Language and thought
 Loaded language
 Platitude
 Rhetorical device
 Thought-terminating cliche

References

External links
 Propaganda critic: Glittering generalities 

Rhetorical techniques
Propaganda techniques using words